The Ironclad Oath was an oath promoted by Radical Republicans and opposed by President Abraham Lincoln during the American Civil War. The Republicans intended to prevent political activity of ex-Confederate soldiers and supporters by requiring all voters and officials to swear they had never supported the Confederacy. Given the temporary disenfranchisement of the numerous Confederate veterans and local civic leaders, a new Republican biracial coalition came to power in the eleven Southern states during Reconstruction. Southern conservative Democrats were angered to have been disenfranchised.

Text

Civil War 
Congress originally devised the Oath in July 1862 for all federal employees, lawyers and federal elected officials. It was applied to Southern voters in the Wade–Davis Bill of 1864, which President Abraham Lincoln pocket vetoed. After the assassination of President Lincoln, new President  Andrew Johnson also opposed it. Both Lincoln and Johnson wanted Southerners instead to swear to an oath that "in the future" that they would support the Union. Lincoln's amnesty oath was integral to his ten percent plan for reconstruction. In 1864, Congress extended the provisions of the Ironclad Oath to its own members but overlooked perjury when it came to seating southern Republicans.

Reconstruction 
The oath was a key factor in removing many ex-Confederates from the political arena during the Reconstruction era of the late 1860s. To take the Ironclad Oath, a person had to swear he had never borne arms against the Union or supported the Confederacy: that is, he had "never voluntarily borne arms against the United States;" had "voluntarily" given "no aid, countenance, counsel or encouragement" to persons in rebellion; and had exercised or attempted to exercise the functions of no office under the Confederacy. A farmer who sold grain to the Confederate Army would be covered. The oath was detested by ex-Confederates, some of whom called it "The Damnesty Oath."

Congress devised the oath in July 1862 for all federal employees, lawyers, and federal elected officials. It was applied to Southern voters in the Wade–Davis Bill of 1864, which President Abraham Lincoln pocket vetoed. President Andrew Johnson also opposed it. Both Johnson and Lincoln wanted Southerners instead to swear to an oath that they "in the future" would support the Union. Lincoln's amnesty oath was integral to his ten percent plan for reconstruction. In 1864 Congress extended the provisions of the ironclad oath to its own members, but overlooked perjury when it came to seating southern Republicans. The historian Harold Hyman says that in 1866, northern Representatives "described the oath as the last bulwark against the return of ex-rebels to power, the barrier behind which Southern Unionists and Negroes protected themselves."

The first Supplemental Reconstruction Act (March 23, 1867) required an oath of past loyalty in order for any man in the South to vote. The local registrar had to swear that he had never held office under Confederacy, nor given aid or comfort to it. They also had to take the ironclad oath.

In 1867, the US Supreme Court held that the federal ironclad oath for attorneys and the similar Missouri state oath for ministers, teachers, and other professionals were unconstitutional because they violated the constitutional prohibitions against bills of attainder and ex post facto laws.

In March 1867, Radicals in Congress passed a law that prohibited anyone from voting in the election of delegates to state constitutional conventions or in the subsequent ratification who was prohibited from holding office under Section 3 of the pending Fourteenth Amendment:  Those exclusions were less inclusive than the requirements of the Ironclad Oath. The exclusions allowed the Republican coalitions to carry the elections in every southern state except Virginia. The Republican-dominated legislatures wrote and enacted state new constitutions that applied to all state officials and could not be repealed by an ordinary vote of the legislature.

The Republicans applied the oath in the South to keep political opponents from holding office or (in some states) from even voting. Hyman says, "most Southerners, even good Republican supporters, were disfranchised by the ironclad oath's blanket provisions rather than by the Fourteenth Amendment's highly selective disabilities."

Perman emphasizes that the Republican ascendancy in the South was "extremely precarious" because the electorate had been defined by Congress, and "many potential opponents had been disfranchised, while others have simply refused to participate in what they regarded as a rigged election." Perman argues that while the Radicals had controlled the state constitutional conventions, they increasingly lost power inside the Republican Party to conservative forces, which repudiated disfranchisement and proscription. Voters in Texas, Virginia, and Mississippi voted down the new constitutions even though many opponents were disfranchised. The result was that by 1870 in every state except Arkansas, the Republicans dropped the restrictions against ex-Confederates and supporters, such as the Ironclad Oath. In Arkansas the Republicans split, which led to an armed conflict called the Brooks–Baxter War.

In 1871, Congress modified the oath to permit all former rebels to use the 1868 formula to swear to "future loyalty." US President Ulysses S. Grant vetoed the law, but Congress passed it.

Voting restrictions on former Confederates varied by state during the rest of the Reconstruction era. Few were disenfranchised in Georgia, Texas, Florida, North Carolina, and South Carolina. Alabama and Arkansas banned only those ineligible to hold office under the Fourteenth Amendment. Louisiana banned newspaper editors and religious ministers who had supported secession or anybody who had voted for the secession ordinance but allowed them to vote if they took an oath for Radical Reconstruction, a much more lenient avowal than that required by the Ironclad Oath. In states with disenfranchisement, the maximum was 10–20% of otherwise-eligible white voters; most states had much smaller proportions disenfranchised. In the South, the most support for the Ironclad Oath came from white Republicans from the Hill Counties, where they needed it to gain local majorities.

In May 1884, President Chester Arthur signed the law repealing the remaining Ironclad Oaths and jurors' test oath statutes.

See also 
Redeemers

Notes

References 
 Belz, Herman. Emancipation and Equal Rights: Politics and Constitutionalism in the Civil War Era 1978.
 Belz, Herman. Reconstructing the Union: Theory and Policy during the Civil War 1969.
 Benedict, Michael Les A Compromise of Principle: Congressional Republicans and Reconstruction, 1863–1869 1974.
 Foner, Eric. Reconstruction: America's Unfinished Revolution, 1863-1877 1988. Harper & Row: New York. 
 Harris, William C. With Charity for All: Lincoln and the Restoration of the Union 1997.
 Hyman, Harold M. A More Perfect Union: The Impact of the Civil War and Reconstruction on the Constitution 1973.
 Hyman, Harold M. To Try Men's Souls: Loyalty Tests in American History (1959)  online
 Hyman, Harold M.  Era of the Oath: Northern Loyalty Tests during the Civil War and Reconstruction (1954) online

External links 
 "Missouri Test-Oath" in the Catholic Encyclopedia

Reconstruction Era
Emergency laws in the United States
 
Oaths
History of voting rights in the United States
Electoral restrictions